Most of the counties of England were divided into hundreds or wapentakes from the late Anglo-Saxon period and these were, with a few exceptions, effectively abandoned as administrative divisions in the 19th century.

In Wales a similar Celtic system of division called cantrefi (a hundred farmsteads) had existed for centuries and was of particular importance in the administration of the Welsh law. Following the Laws in Wales Acts 1535 and 1542, Wales was divided into hundreds to be consistent with England.

Bedfordshire

Barford
Biggleswade
Clifton
Flitt
Manshead
Redbornestoke
Stodden
Willey
Wixamtree

Berkshire

The County of Berkshire comprised 20 Hundreds and 193 parishes and parts of four others. From The National Gazetteer of Britain and Ireland (1868), Victoria County History Berkshire Vol 3 (1923) & Vol 4 (1924)

Buckinghamshire

Until at least the time of the Domesday Survey in 1086 there were 18 hundreds in Buckinghamshire. It has been suggested however that neighbouring hundreds had already become more closely associated in the 11th century so that by the end of the 14th century the original or ancient hundreds had been consolidated into 8 larger hundreds.

Ashendon Hundred
Aylesbury Hundred – consolidated from the eleventh century Aylesbury, Risborough and Stone hundreds
Buckingham Hundred
Cottesloe Hundred
Newport Hundred

Chiltern Hundreds
Burnham Hundred
Desborough Hundred
Stoke Hundred

Cambridgeshire

Cambridgeshire was divided into 17 hundreds, plus the borough of Cambridge. Each hundred had a separate council that met each month to rule on local judicial and taxation matters. In 1929 the hundreds contained the following parishes.

Cheshire

From Harris, B. E., and Thacker, A. T. (1987). The Victoria History of the County of Chester. (Volume 1: Physique, Prehistory, Roman, Anglo-Saxon, and Domesday). Oxford: Oxford University Press. .

Broxton
Bucklow
Eddisbury
Macclesfield
Nantwich
Northwich
Wirral

Cornwall

In Cornwall, the name calqued cantrev

From GENUKI Genuki: Cornwall, Cornwall

Penwith (Penwyth)
Kerrier (Keryer)
Pydar (Pedera)
Powder (Pow Ereder)
Trigg (Trigor)
Lesnewth (Lysnowyth)
Stratton (Stradneth)
West (Fawy)
East (Ryslegh)

For some purposes, the Isles of Scilly were counted as a tenth hundred.

Cumberland

Cumberland was divided into wards, analogous to hundreds. From the National Gazetteer of Britain and Ireland Genuki: CUMBERLAND, England - History and Description, 1868, Cumberland

Allerdale-above-Derwent
Allerdale-below-Derwent
Cumberland
Eskdale
Leath

Derbyshire

The civil divisions of Derbyshire were anciently called wapentakes. In the Domesday Survey of 1086 are mentioned the wapentakes of Scarvedale, Hamestan, Morlestan, Walecross, and Apultre, and a district called Peche-fers. Divided into hundreds by 1273. From GENUKI Genuki: DERBYSHIRE, England - History and Description, 1868, Derbyshire (based on the 1868 Gazette):

High Peak—Hamestan wapentake and perhaps Peche-fers district in 1086; Peck wapentake by 1273.
Wirksworth—Called a wapentake as late as 1817.
Scarsdale
Morleston and Litchurch—Called in the Domesday Survey of 1086, Morlestan or Morleystone wapentake and Littlechurch wapentake, and in the Hundred-Roll of 1273, Littlechirch; by 1300 combined as the hundred of Morleston and Litchurch.
Appletree
Repton and Gresley—In 1274 formed the separate wapentakes of Repindon and Greselegh (owned by the King and the heirs of the Earl of Chester respectively); in 1086 the large Walecross wapentake.

Devon

In 1850 there were thirty-two hundreds in Devon according to White's History, Gazetteer, and Directory of Devonshire

Dorset

County Durham
County Durham was divided into wards, analogous to hundreds.  From an 1840 map of County Durham Genuki: Co Durham in 1840, Durham.

Chester-le-Street
Sadberge
Easington
Stockton

Essex

Barstable (sometimes spelled Barnstable)
Becontree
Chafford
Chelmsford
Clavering
Dengie, known at the time of Domesday as Witbrictesherna (Wibrihtesherne) Hundred
Dunmow
Freshwell
Harlow
Liberty of Havering, also sometimes known as Romford Hundred
Hinckford
Lexden
Ongar
Rochford
Tendring
Thurstable
Uttlesford
Waltham
Winstree
Witham

According to essex1841.com Hundreds in the  Essex 1841 census the 1841 census also recorded Harwich hundred, which the Victoria County History places within Tendring.

Gloucestershire

The thirty-nine hundreds mentioned in the Domesday Survey and the thirty-one hundreds of the Hundred Rolls of 1274 differ very widely in name and extent both from each other and from the twenty-eight hundreds of the present day.
From the National Gazetteer of Britain and Ireland Genuki: Miscellaneous Places, Gloucestershire, Gloucestershire
Barton Regis
Berkeley
Bishop's Cleeve
Bisley
Bledisloe
Botloe
Bradley
Brightwell's Barrow
Cheltenham
Cleeve
Crowthorne-with-Minety
Deerhurst
Dudstone (upper, middle and lower divisions)
Grumbalds Ash
Henbury
Kiftsgate (upper and lower divisions)
Langley and Swinehead
Longtree
Lower Slaughter
Lower Tewkesbury
Lower Thornbury
Pucklechurch
Rapsgate
St Briavels
Tibaldstone
Upper Slaughter
Upper Tewkesbury
Upper Thornbury
Westbury
Westminster
Whitstone (upper and lower divisions) – absorbed the Blacklow hundred by 1220.

The Duchy of Lancaster (Gloucestershire) liberty was sometimes counted as a hundred.

Hampshire
The Domesday Survey mentions 44 hundreds in Hampshire, recorded as HanteScire and abbreviated as Hante. By the 14th century the number had been reduced to 37. The hundreds of East Medina and West Medina in the Isle of Wight are mentioned in 1316. The Isle of Wight obtained a county council of its own in 1890 and became a full ceremonial county in 1974.

Hampshire has in the past been named Southamptonshire and is so recorded in the Commonwealth Instrument of Government, 1653. The name of the administrative county was changed from 'County of Southampton' to 'County of Hampshire' on 1 April 1959. The short form of the name, often used in postal addresses, is Hants.

The 44 Domesday-era hundreds were: Amesbury, Andover, Ashley, Barton, Basingstoke, Bermondspit, Bosbarrow, Bosham, Bountisborough, Bowcombe, Brightford, Broughton, Buddlesgate, Calbourne, Chalton, Charldon, Chuteley, Crondall, Droxford, East Meon, Edgegate, Evingar, Falemere, Fareham, Farringdon, Fawley, Fordingbridge, Hoddington, Holdshott, Hurstbourne, Kingsclere, Mansbridge, Meonstoke, Micheldever, Neatham, Odiham, Overton, Portsdown, Redbridge, Ringwood, Somborne, Titchfield, Waltham, Welford

In the 19th century, the hundreds were listed as:

Herefordshire
The hundreds mentioned in the Domesday Survey and the hundreds of the Hundred Rolls of 1274 differ very widely in name and extent both from each other and from the ten hundreds of the present day. Not included in the hundreds of Herefordshire at the time of Domesday, the sparsely populated Welch area of Archenfield included Ashe Ingen, Baysham and Kings Caple.

From Domesday (1086):
Bromsash
Castlery
Cutestornes
Dinedor
Ewias
Greitrewes
Hazeltree – Hezetre
Plegelgete
Radlow
Sellack
Stradel
Tornelaus

From The National Gazetteer of Britain and Ireland (1868) Genuki: Miscellaneous Places, Herefordshire, Herefordshire
Broxash
Ewyas-Lacy
Greytree
Grimsworth
Radlow
Stretford
Webtree
Wigmore
Wolphy
Wormelow (upper and lower divisions)

Hertfordshire

(Danais & Tring added as per History of Hertfordshire)

Braughing
Broadwater
Cashio (Previously known as St Albans Hundred)
Dacorum
Danais (merged with Tring to form Dacorum)
Edwintree
Hertford
Hitchin The hundred of Hitchin: Introduction and map | British History Online
Odsey
Tring (merged with Danais to form Dacorum)

Huntingdonshire

Hurstingstone
Leightonstone
Norman Cross
Toseland

Kent

From Kent Genealogy Kent Genealogy England.  Early Medieval Kent was traditionally divided into East and West Kent, and into lathes and hundreds.

The hundreds contained parishes and portions of parishes. In many regions of England as well as Kent, an entire parish would be within one hundred, yet especially along rivers and estuaries which had previously seen invasion, the Kentish hundreds were smaller in area and "shared" parishes to institutionalize resiliency and collective responsibility for defence and justice.

East Kent

Lathe of St. Augustine

Lathe of Scraye

Lathe of Scraye formed by mid-1200s from the half lathe of Milton (which consisted of the hundred of Milton and the Isle of Sheppey) and the Lathe of Wye (which consisted of the Isle of Harty (which is conjoined to the Isle of Sheppey) and many additional hundreds.

Due to a judicial administrative reform in the mid-19th century, the some hundreds of the Lathe of Scray were moved from East Kent administration to West Kent administration:

Lathe of Shepway

The Lathe of Shepway also included the Cinque Port Liberty of New Romney in Romney Marsh, with the parish of Lydd as a limb of the Liberty.

West Kent

Lathe of Sutton at Hone

Lathe of Aylesford

plus the Lowey of Tonbridge

Lathe of Scraye (part)

In 1857 the provisions of the Act of 9 Geo. IV were invoked to re-examine the whole structure of Lathes and their divisions in providing for the administration of justice. The Lower Division of the Lathe of Scray, which formed the southernmost part of the Lathe, became part of West Kent, and consisted of the following Hundreds:

Lancashire

Amounderness
Blackburn
Leyland
Lonsdale
Salford
West Derby

Leicestershire

Leicestershire was originally divided into four wapentakes, but these were usually later described as hundreds. From the 1911 Encyclopædia Britannica after 1346 the six hundreds were:

East Goscote
Framland
Gartree
Guthlaxton
Sparkenhoe
West Goscote

In the Domesday Book, West Goscote and East Goscote made up just Goscote and Sparkenhoe did not yet exist. The division which brought East and West Goscote and Sparkenhoe into existence was made in 1346.

Lincolnshire

Lincolnshire was divided into three Parts, each of which was divided into wapentakes, analogous to hundreds.

From map on Lincolnshire County Council website:

Parts of Holland
Elloe
Kirton
Skirbeck

Parts of Kesteven
Aswardhurn
Aveland
Boothby Graffoe (Higher and Lower divisions)
Beltisloe
Flaxwell
Langoe (First and Second divisions)
Loveden
Ness
Winnibriggs and Threo (wapentake)

Parts of Lindsey
North Riding of Lindsey
Bradley-Haverstoe
Ludborough
Walshcroft (North and South divisions)
Yarborough

South Riding of Lindsey
Calceworth (Marsh and Wold divisions)
Candleshoe (Marsh and Wold divisions)
Gartree (North and South divisions)
Hill
Louth-Eske (Marsh and Wold divisions)
Wraggoe (East and West divisions)

West Riding of Lindsey
Aslacoe (East and West divisions)
Corringham
Epworth (compare Isle of Axholme)
Manley (East, North, and West divisions)
Lawress
Well

Middlesex

Edmonton
Elthorne
Gore
Isleworth (recorded in 1086 as Hounslow)
Ossulstone
Spelthorne

Norfolk

Northamptonshire
In 1086, there were 39 hundreds in the county: Alboldstow, Alwardsley, Barcheston, Beltisloe, Bloxham, Bumbelowe, Cleyley, Coleshill, Collingtree, Corby, Cuttlestone, Fawsley (Foxley), Gravesend (later absorbed into Fawsley Hundred), Guilsborough, Hamfordshoe, Higham, Hunesberi, Huxloe, Kirtlington, Mawsley, Navisford, Navisland, Ness, Nobottle, Offlow, Orlingbury, Polebrook, Rothwell, Spelhoe, Stoke (By the time of the 'Nomina Villarum' a survey carried out in the first half of the 12th century, the Stoke Hundred had been absorbed into the Corby Hundred), Stotfold, Sutton, Towcester, Upton, Warden, Willybrook, Witchley, Wootton and Wymersley.

From the Northamptonshire Family History Society the hundreds in the 1800s are:

The liberty and Soke of Peterborough was sometimes called Nassaburgh hundred.

Northumberland
Following the Harrying of the North and subsequent incursions from Scotland, the high sheriff of Northumberland was granted extraordinary powers. The county was subdivided into baronies, which were arranged in six wards and subdivided into constabularies. The wards were analogous to hundreds. From the National Gazetteer of Britain and Ireland (1868) GENUKI: The National Gazetteer of Great Britain and Ireland (1868) - Northumberland

Bamburgh
Castle 
Coquetdale
Glendale
Morpeth
Tynedale

Nottinghamshire

Nottinghamshire was divided into wapentakes, analogous to hundreds.  From the Thoroton Society of Nottinghamshire The Thoroton Society of Nottinghamshire: Nottinghamshire

Bassetlaw (North Clay, South Clay and Hatfield divisions)
Bingham (North and South divisions)
Broxtowe (North and South divisions)
Newark (North and South divisions)
Rushcliffe (North and South divisions)
Thurgarton (North and South divisions)

Oxfordshire

From

Bampton
Banbury
Binfield
Bloxham
Bullingdon
Chadlington
Dorchester
Ewelme (Known as Benson hundred in 1070)
Kirtlington - A hundred at the time of Domesday, it was combined to form the major portion of Ploughley hundred by 1169.
Langtree
Lewknor
Pyrton - Pirton is a later Latinised spelling.
Ploughley - Name first mentioned in the form Pokedelawa hundred in the Pipe Roll of 1169.
Thame
Wootton - Includes the three hundreds dependent on the royal manor of Wootton in 1086 and sometimes called the "three hundreds of Wootton" in the later 12th century: Shipton hundred, (unknown name) hundred and pre-1086 Wootten hundred. The hundred was later divided into two administrative regions:
Wootton (Northern part) - 19 parishes including Barford St. Michael, Deddington, Glympton, Heythrop, Rousham, Sandford St. Martin, South Newington, Stonesfield, Tackley, Wootton, the Astons (North Aston and Steeple Aston), the Bartons (Steeple Barton and Westcott Barton), the Wortons (formed in 1932 by combining Nether Worton and Over Worton parishes), and the three Tews (Great Tew, Little Tew and Duns Tew).
Wootton (Southern part) - 15 parishes and several extraparochial places
Within Woolton hundred yet separately administered were the areas of Oxford City & University, Oxford City and Oxford Liberty.

Rutland

Alstoe
East
Martinsley
Oakham
Wrandike

Shropshire

From GENUKI

† — including the Shropshire exclave of Halesowen
‡ The liberties of the borough of Shrewsbury and priory/borough of Wenlock were extensive and are usually considered as hundreds (Wenlock was sometimes described as the "franchise of Wenlock").

Somerset

From the National Gazetteer of Britain and Ireland

Staffordshire

From GENUKI

East Cuttlestone
West Cuttlestone
North Offlow
Souh Offlow
North Pirehill
South Pirehill
North Seisdon
South Seisdon
North Totmonslow
South Totmonslow

Suffolk

Surrey

There are thirteen hundreds and one half hundred:

Sussex

Sussex was divided into rapes, and then hundreds.

Arundel Rape

The Arundel Rape covered nearly all of what is now West Sussex until about 1250, when it was split into two rapes the Arundel Rape and the Chichester Rape. In 1834 it contained five hundreds sub-divided into fifty six parishes.

Avisford
Bury
Poling
Rotherbridge
West Easwrith

Bramber Rape

The Bramber Rape lies between the Rape of Arundel in the west and Lewes in the east. In 1834 it contained 40 parishes in the following hundreds:
 Brightford
 Burbeach
 West Grinstead (Grensted in the Domesday Survey)
 Poling (once known as Rieberge)
 Singlecross
 Steyning
 Tarring (a peculier of the Archbishop of Canterbury)
 Tipnoak

as well as 3 half hundreds

 East Easwrith
 Fishersgate
 Wyndham

Chichester Rape

The combined Chichester and Arundel Rape covered nearly all of what is now West Sussex until about 1250, when it was split into two rapes the Arundel Rape and the Chichester Rape. In 1834 it contained seven hundreds and seventy-four parishes.
Aldwick
Bosham
Box and Stockbridge
Dumpford
Easebourne
Manhood
Westbourne and Singleton

Hastings Rape

Medieval sources talk of a group of people who were separate to that of the South Saxons they were known as the Haestingas. The area of Sussex they occupied became the Rape of Hastings.
It encompassed the easternmost part of Sussex, with the county of Kent to its east and the Rape of Pevensey to its west. The Anglo-Saxon hundred of Hailesaltede was later partitioned into Battle Hundred and Netherfield Hundred. In 1833, the Rape of Hastings had 13 hundreds giving a total of about 154,060 acres.

 Baldstrow
 Battle
 Bexhill
 Foxearle
 Goldspur
 Gostrow
 Guestling
 Hawkesborough
 Henhurst
 Netherfield
 Ninfield
 Shoyswell
 Staple

Lewes Rape

The Rape of Lewes is bounded by the Rape of Bramber on its west and the Rape of Pevensey on its east. Although it had the same amount of hundreds in 1833 as in the Domesday survey, there had been some cases of manors and parishes been taken from one and added to another hundred, and in other cases the hundreds had been divided and lost.
Barcombe
Buttinghill
Dean
Fishergate
Holmestrow
Poynings
Preston
Street
Swanborough
Whalesbourne
Younsmere (also Falmer)

Pevensey Rape

The Pevensey Rape lies between the Rapes of Lewes and Hastings. In 1833 it contained 19 hundreds and 52 parishes
Alciston
Bishopstone
Danehill Horsted
Dill
Eastbourne
East Grinstead (Grinsted in the Domesday survey)
Flexborough
Hartfield
Lindfield Burley-Arches (also Burarches)
Lowey or Liberty of Pevensey - Part of Port of Hastings, so having the immunities and privileges of the Cinque Ports.
Loxfield Camden
Loxfield Dorset
Longbridge
Ringmer
Rotherfield
Rushmonden
Shiplake
Totnore
Willingdon

Warwickshire

Warwickshire was divided into four hundreds, with each hundred consisting of a number of divisions. 
Barlinchway (also Barlichway)
 Alcester
 Henley
 Snitterfield
 Stratford
Hemlingford, formerly named Coleshill
 Atherstone
 Birmingham
 Solihull
 Tamworth
Kington (also Kineton)
 Brailes
 Burton Dassett
 Kington
 Warwick
Knightlow
 Kenilworth
 Kirby
 Rugby
 Southam

Westmorland
Westmorland was divided into four wards, analogous to hundreds.  Pairs of wards made up the two Baronies.  From Magna Britannica et Hibernia (1736) Genuki: Westmorland, Westmorland

Barony of Kendal
The Barony of Kendal had two wards:
Kendal
Lonsdale

Barony of Westmorland
The Barony of Westmorland had two wards:
East Ward
West Ward

Wiltshire
There were 40 hundreds in Wiltshire at the time of the Domesday Survey.
Hundreds in 1835 were:

Worcestershire

The ancient hundreds in 1086 at the time of the Domesday survey were:
Ash, Came, Celfledetorn, Clent, Cresslow, Cutestornes, Doddingtree, Dudstone, Fernecumbe, Fishborough, Greston, Ossulstone, Oswaldslow, Pershore, Plegelgete, Seisdon, Tewkesbury, Tibblestone, Wolfhay.
Some of the parishes within these hundreds, such as Feckenham in Ash Hundred, or Gloucester in Dudstone Hundred, may have partially been in other counties or were transferred between counties in the intervening years.

Over the centuries, some of the hundreds were amalgamated and appear in many useful statistical records. The hundreds that continued their courts until disuse include:
Blackenhurst
Doddingtree
Halfshire – combined the Domesday hundreds of Clent and Cresslow
Oswaldslow – combined three ancient hundreds
Pershore

Yorkshire

Yorkshire has three Ridings, East, North and West.  Each of these was divided into wapentakes, analogous to hundreds.

The Ainsty wapentake, first associated with the West Riding, became associated in the fifteenth century with the City of York, outside the Riding system.

The hundreds of Amounderness and Lonsdale in Lancashire plus part of Westmorland were considered as part of Yorkshire in the Domesday Book.

East Riding
From GENUKI GENUKI: Definitions of the terms used to describe areas of land and habitation in the county of Yorkshire.

Buckrose
Dickering Wapentake
Harthill Wapentake (Bainton Beacon, Holme Beacon, Hunsley Beacon and Wilton Beacon divisions)
Holderness Wapentake (North, Middle and South divisions)
Howdenshire
Ouse and Derwent

The other division of the riding was Hullshire.

North Riding
Allerton
Birdforth
Bulmer
Gilling East
Gilling West
Hallikeld
Hang East
Hang West
Langbaurgh (West and East divisions)
Pickering Lythe – Formed from the Domesday wapentake of Dic, and additionally by 1284–85 the parish of Sinnington and by (circa 15th-16th century) the parish of Kirkby Misperton, both from the Domesday wapentake of Maneshou.
Ryedale – First mentioned by name in 1165–66, probably when its court was relocated there. Formed from the Domesday wapentake of Maneshou minus Sinnington and Kirkby Misperton parishes, plus the additional parish of Lastingham from the Domesday wapentake of Dic. In the 19th century, Ryedale contained the parishes of Ampleforth; Appleton-Le-Street; Barton-Le-Street; Great Edston; Gilling; Helmsley; Hovingham; Kirkby Moorside; Kirkdale; Lastingham; New Malton, including the parishes of St. Leonard and St. Michael; Old Malton; Normanby; Nunnington; Oswaldkirk; Salton; Scawton; Slingsby; Stonegrave.
Whitby Strand

West Riding
From GENUKI GENUKI: Definitions of the terms used to describe areas of land and habitation in the county of Yorkshire.

Agbrigg and Morley (Agbrigg and Morley divisions)
Ainsty wapentake (___ and ___ divisions) (became a district named Ainsty of York in the 15th century)
Barkston Ash Wapentake
Claro Wapentake (Upper and Lower divisions) (Burghshire wapentake was renamed in the 12th century)
Ewcross
Osgoldcross Wapentake
Skyrack (Upper and Lower divisions)
Staincliffe Wapentake (East and West divisions)
Staincross Wapentake
Strafforth and Tickhill (Upper and Lower divisions)

The Hundreds of Wales

Wales was divided into hundreds following the Laws in Wales Acts 1535 and 1542. This resulted in the creation of five new counties (Monmouthshire, Brecknockshire, Radnorshire, Montgomeryshire and Denbighshire) from the Marches of Wales. Combined with the transformation of the Lordships of Pembroke and Glamorgan into new counties, with the existing counties of Cardiganshire, Caernarfonshire and Flintshire (created by the Statute of Rhuddlan) this gave Wales thirteen counties.

Anglesey
Anglesey was divided into six hundreds:

Dindaethwy
Llifon
Malltraeth
Menai
Talybolion
Twrcelyn

Brecknockshire
Brecknockshire was divided into six hundreds.

Builth
Crucywel
Defynnog
Merthyr
Pencelli
Talgarth

Caernarvonshire
Caernarvonshire was divided into ten hundreds: 

 Commitmaen
Creuddyn
Dinlaen
Eifionydd 
Cafflogion
Isaf
Uchaf
 Nanconwy
Is Gwyrfai
Uwch Gwyrfai

Cardiganshire
Cardiganshire was divided into five hundreds.

Genaur Glyn
Ilar
Moyddyn
Penarth
Troedyraur

Carmarthenshire
Carmarthenshire was divided into eight hundreds.

Carnwyllion
Catheiniog
Caeo
Cedweli
Derllys
Elfed
Is Cennen
Perfedd

Denbighshire
Denbighshire was divided into six hundreds:

 Broomfield
Chirk
Is Aled
Is Dulas
 Ruthin
Yale

Flintshire
Flintshire was divided into five hundreds:

Coleshill
Maylor
Mold
Prestatyn
Rhuddlan

Glamorgan
Glamorgan was divided into ten hundreds:

Caerphilly
Cowbridge
Dinas Powys
Kibbor
Llangyfelach
Miskin
Neath
Newcastle
Ogmore
Swansea

Merionethshire
Merionethshire was divided into five hundreds:

Ardudwy
Edernion
 Ystumanner
Penilyn
 Tal Y Bon and Mawddwy

Monmouthshire
Monmouthshire was divided into five hundreds:

Abergavenny
Caldicot
Rhaglan
Skenfrith
Usk
Wentloog

Montgomeryshire
Montgomeryshire was divided into eight hundreds:

Cawrse
 Deuddwr
Llanfyllin
Machynlleth
 Mathrafal
Montgomery 
Newtown
 Pool

Pembrokeshire
Pembrokeshire was divided into seven hundreds:

Castlemartin
Cemais
Cilgerran
Dewisland
Dungleddy
Narberth
Rhos

Radnorshire
Radnorshire was divided into six hundreds:

Cefnllys
Colwyn
Knighton
 Painscastle
Radnor
 Rhayader

References

Bibliography

Notes on Wapentakes in Lincolnshire, from 'Introduction: Lost vills and other forgotten places', Final Concords of the County of Lincoln: 1244-1272 (1920), pp. L-LXV
 

Local government in the United Kingdom